The purple-shaded gem (Euchalcia variabilis) is a moth of the family Noctuidae.

Description

The wingspan is 34–42 mm. The upperside of the forewings is varied with rosy in the basal area. Also, the transversal lines are bordered with rosy. The central area is dark brown. The dark basal line is slightly curved or almost straight. The larvae is green with a black head, numerous blackish dots, a dark stripe on the back, and a yellow lateral line. This species closely resembles Euchalcia bellieri, but it is quite larger. The moth flies from June to August depending on the location.

The larvae feed from May to July on larkspur (Delphinium species), meadow-rue (Thalictrum species) and monkshood (Aconitum species).

Distribution and habitat
This species is found in woodlands, glades, and mountain forests of Central and Southern Europe through the Southern Ural mountains north to Mongolia.

References

External links

 Paolo Mazzei, Daniel Morel, Raniero Panfili  Moths and Butterflies of Europe and North Africa
 Butterflies and Moths of Finland

Plusiinae
Moths of Europe
Moths of Asia